is a Japanese animation studio founded on May 1, 2017.

History
Bibury Animation Studios was founded on May 1, 2017 by Tensho, an animation director and director of Kin-iro Mosaic, the Grisaia series, and Rewrite, both for the animation component of the visual novel while working for White Fox and later for the anime by 8-Bit. For the first two years of the company's existence, the studio worked solely as a sub-contracting studio, providing mostly in-between and 2nd key animation services. In 2019, the studio produced its first major work, Grisaia: Phantom Trigger the Animation, directed by studio founder Tensho (who directed previous installments of the series), and in the same year, its first television series, Azur Lane: The Animation.

It has a sister studio, Bibury Animation CG, which provides 3DCG animation and designs as an outsourcing company for other studios, including Bibury itself.

Works

Television series

Films

References

External links

  
 

 
Animation studios in Tokyo
Japanese animation studios
Japanese companies established in 2017
Mass media companies established in 2017